NASA Astronaut Group 8 was a group of 35 astronauts announced on January 16, 1978. It was the first NASA selection since Group 6 in 1967, and was the largest group to that date. The class was the first to include female and minority astronauts; of the 35 selected, six were women, one of them being Jewish American, three were African American, and one was Asian American. Due to the long delay between the last Apollo lunar mission in 1972 and the first flight of the Space Shuttle in 1981, few astronauts from the older groups remained, and they were outnumbered by the newcomers, who became known as the Thirty-Five New Guys (TFNG). Since then, a new group of candidates has been selected roughly every two years.

In Astronaut Group 8, two different kinds of astronaut were selected: pilots and mission specialists. The group consisted of 15 pilots, all test pilots, and 20 mission specialists. NASA stopped sending non-pilots for one year of pilot training. It also ceased appointing astronauts on selection. Instead, starting with this group, new selections were considered astronaut candidates rather than fully-fledged astronauts until they finished their training.

Four members of this group, Dick Scobee, Judith Resnik, Ellison Onizuka, and Ronald McNair, died in the Space Shuttle Challenger disaster. These four, plus Shannon Lucid, received the Congressional Space Medal of Honor, giving this astronaut class five total recipients of this top NASA award.  This is second only to the New Nine class of 1962, which received seven. The careers of the TFNGs would span the entire Space Shuttle Program. They reshaped the image of the American astronaut into one that more closely resembled the diversity of American society, and opened the doors for others that would follow.

Background

Equal employment opportunity at NASA
The enactment of the Equal Employment Opportunity Act of 1972 gave teeth to the promise of the Civil Rights Act of 1964 to address the persistent and entrenched employment discrimination against women, African Americans and other minority groups in American society. Specifically, it empowered the Equal Employment Opportunity Commission to take enforcement action against individuals, employers, and labor unions that violated the employment provisions of the 1964 Act, and expanded the jurisdiction of the commission to deal with them. It also extended the scope of affirmative action, mandating that all executive branch agencies also comply with the act. Supporters of the legislation hoped that it would spur social change, but culture was not so easily changed. Women in science and engineering still found the culture off-putting, and while colleges dramatically increased their enrolment of women in these fields, many women found themselves in classrooms mostly filled with men, some of whom were openly hostile to their presence. Although in the early 1970s women received 40 percent of the PhDs awarded in biology, they represented just 4 percent of those in engineering; the 10 percent mark was not reached until the 1990s, by which time African Americans were awarded 2 percent of doctorates in all fields of science and engineering.

The National Aeronautics and Space Administration (NASA) was no paragon of diversity in 1972. Most of its twelve major facilities were located in the southern United States. Eight of them had created equal employment/affirmative action offices, but the staff of six of them was entirely white. In 1971, the Administrator of NASA, James C. Fletcher, appointed Ruth Bates Harris, an African-American, as NASA's Director of Equal Employment Opportunity (EEO), but before she commenced work on 4 October 1971, Fletcher demoted her to deputy director, and reduced her responsibility to dealing with contractors only. In 1973, 5.6 percent of NASA staff were minorities, and 18 percent were women at a time when the United States federal civil service averages were 20 and 34 percent respectively. Although NASA employed 4,432 women, only 310 were in science and engineering, of which just four were in the top grades, counting Harris. Although it could be argued that women and minorities were under-represented in the aerospace engineering industry as a whole, NASA was no better at recruiting women as lawyers than as scientists, and while minorities were well represented in the ranks of NASA's janitors (69 percent), it employed no women to perform this work. The Kennedy Space Center had 43 grades of secretaries so women could be promoted without reaching management levels.

Harris soon proved a feisty and forceful presence who was unafraid to ask uncomfortable questions. After reading a newspaper report that Wernher von Braun had used slave labor to build his rockets during World War II, she asked him if it was true. She wanted her original job back, and civil service rules required that affirmative action directors report directly to the administrators of government agencies. To fill the position, NASA's deputy administrator, George Low, appointed Dudley McConnell, NASA's most senior African-American engineer to the position, with Harris as one of his deputies. Harris, Samuel Lynn (a former Tuskegee airman) and Joseph M. Hogan prepared a report on the state of equal opportunity in NASA on their own time, and submitted it directly to Fletcher. The report concluded:

Fletcher fired Harris, transferred Hogan, and gave Lynn a stern warning. To the surprise of Fletcher and Low, Harris's firing generated  a storm of negative coverage in the media. Seventy NASA employees protested the decision, and NAACP Legal Defense Fund lawyers petitioned the United States Civil Service Commission to rule Harris's dismissal as an unlawful reprisal. NASA's legal counsel advised Fletcher to settle. The United States Senate Committee on Appropriations wanted for an explanation, and Senator William Proxmire grilled McConnell. Aides urged Fletcher to appear before the United States Senate Committee on Aeronautical and Space Sciences. Fletcher demurred; he was a Mormon, and his church practised racial exclusion until 1978, so he sent the Jewish Low in his place in January 1974. Low urged McConnell to hire Harriet G. Jenkins as his deputy, and when he resisted, Low had Fletcher hire her. In August 1974, Harris was re-hired, but in a new role in community outreach and public relations, and she left NASA in 1976. Jenkins replaced McConnell, and would hold down the position until 1992. Great changes would occur on her watch.

Preparing for the Space Shuttle
Harris noted that one issue that came up constantly was that of when the all-white, all-male NASA Astronaut Corps would recruit its first woman or a minority astronaut. In a July 19, 1972, memorandum to Ted Groo, the Associate Administrator for Manned Space Flight, she urged that this be rectified as a matter of urgency. NASA's directors agreed in September 1972 on the need for a plan to be drawn up defining the schedule and requirements for crewing the Space Shuttle, but it was not expected to fly before 1978, and NASA already had sufficient astronauts to carry out scheduled missions and the proposed early Space Shuttle flights too, so no new astronauts would be required before 1982. Assuming twenty months between a call for applications and an individual's first flight, it was estimated NASA would not need to initiate an astronaut recruitment process before 1980.

Planning proceeded on the make up of a Space Shuttle crew. By 1972, five roles were envisaged:
 Commander (CDR), an astronaut who would be responsible for flying the spacecraft, and for all aspects of the mission;
 Pilot (PLT), a co-pilot, an astronaut who would be a deputy to the commander;
 Mission specialist (MS), astronauts who would perform other duties related to the operation of the spacecraft, of which there might be more than one per mission;
 Payload specialist (PS), a non-astronaut with expertise in the spacecraft's payload; and
 Passenger, a non-astronaut present as an uninvolved observer.

Although the payload specialist and passengers would not be astronauts, it was expected that they would have to undergo some astronaut training for safety purposes. An early decision was that mission specialist astronauts would not be required to undergo pilot training, which had been required of the scientist astronauts selected in NASA Astronaut Group 4 in 1965 and NASA Astronaut Group 6 in 1967. The inclusion of a space toilet in the Space Shuttle design permitted a degree of privacy impossible in the Gemini and Apollo spacecraft. This encouraged NASA management to believe that women could fly in space without offending contemporary American social and cultural mores regarding sexuality and hygiene, which might have caused embarrassment to the agency.

Recruitment

Selection board
A comprehensive recruitment plan for pilots was drawn up in 1974, and for mission specialists the following year, but specific provisions to recruit women and minorities were not completed until early 1976. The Director of the Johnson Space Center (JSC), Christopher C. Kraft Jr., created an Astronaut Selection Board on March 12, 1976, and it held its first meeting on March 24. The makeup of the board was:
 Chairman
 George Abbey, Director of Flight Crew Operations, JSC

 Recorder
 Jay F. Honeycutt, Assistant to the Director of the JSC

 Pilot Panel
 John W. Young, astronaut, Chief of the Astronaut Office
 Vance Brand, astronaut
 Martin L. Raines, Director of Safety, Reliability and Quality Assurance
 Joseph D. Atkinson, Chief of the Equal Opportunity Programs Office, JSC
 Jack R. Lister, Personnel Office, JSC
 Donald K. Slayton, astronaut, Manager of Approach and Landing Tests, JSC

 Mission Specialist Panel
 Joseph Kerwin, astronaut, Chief of the Mission Specialist Group, Astronaut Office, JSC
 Robert A. Parker, astronaut
 Edward Gibson, astronaut
 Carolyn Huntoon, Chief of Metabolism and Biochemistry Branch, JSC
 Joseph D. Atkinson, Chief of the Equal Opportunity Programs Office, JSC
 Jack R. Lister, Personnel Office, JSC
 James Trainor, Associate Chief of the High Energy Physics Laboratory, Goddard Space Flight Center
 Robert Piland, Associate Director for Program Development, JSC 

By this time it had been nearly ten years since NASA had last conducted an astronaut selection process in June 1967; NASA Astronaut Group 7 had transferred from the United States Air Force's Manned Orbiting Laboratory in June 1969 without one. The presence of Huntoon, a white woman, and Atkinson, a black man, meant that this was the first time people other than white men had served on a NASA astronaut selection board.

Call for applications
On July 8, 1976, NASA issued a call for applications for at least 15 pilot candidates and 15 mission specialist candidates. For the first time, new selections would be considered astronaut candidates rather than fully-fledged astronauts until they finished training and evaluation, which was expected to take two years. Pilot candidate applicants had to have at least a bachelor's degree in engineering, a physical science or mathematics from an accredited institution, although an advanced degree was desirable, and at least 1,000 hours of pilot flying time, preferably in high performance jet aircraft, but 2,000 hours was desirable. The main difference between the two physical classes was that glasses were acceptable for the class 2 physical, if eyesight was 20/20 when corrected.

Military personnel would have to forward applications through their service departments. They would be seconded to NASA, and would receive their usual pay and allowances. Civilians astronaut candidates could apply directly. Their pay was set at Federal government General Schedule grades 7 to 15, depending on achievements and academic experience, with salaries ranging from around $11,000 to $34,000 (equivalent to $ to $  in ). Minorities and women were encouraged  to apply. The deadline for applications was June 30, 1977, with training expected to commence on July 1, 1978.

NASA management were certain that there were highly qualified women and minorities out there, but they needed to persuade them to apply. A special team consisting of Mary Wilmarth and Baley Davis from the JSC Personnel Office, and Joseph D. Atkinson and Jose R. Perez from the JSC Equal Opportunity Programs Office was created to publicize the recruitment effort. NASA centers and NASA contractors were canvassed for prospective applicants, minority and women's professional organizations were contacted, and graduated schools and government agencies were asked to notify their students and employees. Political organizations like the Congressional Black Caucus and NAACP were contacted. Advertisements were placed in minority magazines with minority readership like Ebony, Black Enterprise, Essence and  Jet. Nichelle Nichols, an African-American actor best known for the television series Star Trek was hired to do spot advertising. Her publicity firm, Women in Motion, was paid $49,000 ($). She met with members of community organizations, colleges and institutions to familiarize them with the requirements for Space Shuttle astronaut candidates.

Unlike previous calls for applications, the 1976 one did not specify a requirement for citizenship of the United States. This was because on June 1, 1976, the Supreme Court had ruled in the case of Hampton v. Mow Sun Wong that the Civil Service Commission could not issue regulations prohibiting the employment of non-citizens. It however, leave the door open to their prohibition through statute or executive order. On September 2, 1976, President Gerald Ford issued Executive Order 11935, requiring citizenship for Federal employment, thereby effectively nullifying the Supreme Court's ruling. Some applications were received from non-citizens. On December 7, 1976, NASA's Director of Personnel, Carl Grant, advised the selection board that any applications accepted from non-citizens should be on the understanding that they would take up US citizenship before the end of the two-year training and evaluation period.

Selection process
Between July 1976 and June 1977, the JSC received 24,618 inquiries. Of these 20,440 requested and were sent application packages. Eventually, the total number of applications was 8,079. Most were received in the final two weeks before the deadline date. It was not possible for the selection board to evaluate this many applications, so they were pre-screened to identify the most promising ones. The first pass was to eliminate those that did not meet the minimum requirements. This eliminated over 2,000 applications. The selection board then began processing the remaining 5,680. A point system was then used to rank candidates. For pilots, this took account of hours flown, test pilot experience, types and numbers of different aircraft flown, and grade point average for undergraduate and graduate degrees. For mission specialists, points were awarded for academic degrees, grade point averages, and years of experience.
                                      

The selection board assessed 649 of the pilot applicants as qualified. Of these, 147 were military and 512 were civilians; ten were minorities and eight were women. From these, 80 were selected for interviews, of whom 76 were military and four were civilians; three were minorities but there were no women. The first woman to graduate from the United States Naval Test Pilot School, Beth Hubert, did not do so until 1985, and the first to graduate from the U.S. Air Force Test Pilot School, Jane Holley, in 1974.

Of the mission specialist applicants, 5,680 were regarded as qualified. Of these, 161 were military, six of whom were minorities and three of whom were women. The other 5,519 were civilians. Of these, 332 were minorities and 1,248 were women. The selection board reduced the number of applicants to 208, of which 80 were pilot applicants and 128 were the mission specialist applicants. Of the pilot applicants, 76 were from the military and four were civilians; three of the military applicants were minorities. Of the 128 mission specialist applicants, 45 were from the military, four of whom were minorities and two were women, and 83 were civilians, of whom four were minorities and twelve were women.

The 208 applicants were divided into ten groups of about twenty, and called in to the JSC for interviews and medical tests. The latter were conducted under the supervision of Sam L. Pool, the chief of the Medical services Division at JSC. On April 1, 1977, twenty volunteers were run through the medical selection to work out the procedures and logistics of it. The tests involved 24 procedures, including a general examination by a flight surgeon. The candidates medical history was examined, and psychological, psychiatric, ophthalmological, neurological, dental, musculoskeletal and eye, nose and throat examinations were conducted. Tests were conducted using a rotating chair to test susceptibility to motion sickness, on a treadmill to measure heart rate, and with a Personal Rescue Enclosure to test for claustrophobia. The psychiatric process was not free of gender bias; one consultant was later found to have rejected 40 percent of female applicants in the 1978, 1980, 1984 and 1985 selections but only 7 percent of male ones. Applicants were put up at the Kings Inn Ramada in Clear Lake, Texas, where an evening reception and pre-interview briefing was held. The medical tests eliminated 56 applicants, and three more indicated that they did not wish to proceed. That left 149 applicants (74 pilots and 75 mission specialists) who were listed.

From these the selection board nominated 20 pilot and 20 mission specialist astronaut candidates. However, in November 1977, NASA Administrator Robert A. Frosch that NASA had enough pilot astronauts, and instructed Abbey to reduce the numbers to 15. All five of those dropped at the last minute would later be selected with NASA Astronaut Group 9 in 1980. In all, six of finalists who were passed over in 1978 would later qualify as pilot astronaut candidates in 1980: John Blaha, Roy Bridges, Guy Gardner, Ronald Grabe, Bryan O'Connor,  and Richard Richards as pilots, and six as mission specialists: James Bagian, Bonnie Dunbar, Bill Fisher, John Lounge, Jerry Ross and Robert Springer. Another unsuccessful finalist, John Casper, would be selected with NASA Astronaut Group 10 in 1984. Two others who missed out would eventually fly in space as payload specialists: Millie Hughes-Fulford and Byron Lichtenberg.

On January 16, 1978, Abbey contacted the 35 successful applicants and notified them of their selection, and asked them to confirm that they still wanted the job. Three were outside the United States; Kathy Sullivan was in Halifax, Nova Scotia, Canada, working on her PhD; Steven Hawley was doing post-doctoral research in Chile, and David Walker was serving on the aircraft carrier  in the Mediterranean Sea. The names of the 35 were then publicly released.

Group members

Pilots

Mission specialists

Nickname

Of the 73 astronauts in the seven groups before Group 8, only 27 were still active in 1978, and were outnumbered by the new class. Group 8's name for itself was "TFNG". The abbreviation was deliberately ambiguous; for public purposes, it stood for "Thirty-Five New Guys"; however, within the group itself, it was known to stand for the military phrase, "the fucking new guy", used to denote newcomers to a unit. The selection of a nickname started a tradition that has continued ever since.

An official class patch was designed by NASA artist Robert McCall. It depicted the Space Shuttle, the number 35, and the year 1978. The class patch became another NASA tradition. Judy Resnick and Jim Buchli also designed a class logo depicting a Space Shuttle with 35 astronauts clinging to it. Below was the group name "TFNG" and the group motto "We Deliver". The artwork adorned coffee mugs and T-shirts, which came in red and blue for the two teams into which the TFNG were split.

Demographics
The 35 new astronaut candidates were introduced to the public in a press conference at the Olin E. Teague auditorium at JSC on February 1, 1978. Most of the attention was on the six women, and, to a lesser extent, the four minority men. Mike Mullane later recalled that the 25 white males were "invisible". The hiring of the six women as astronaut candidates doubled the number of women in technical roles in JSC, but they found counsellors and role models in Carolyn Huntoon and Ivy Hooks. Huntoon was the most senior woman in a technical position at JSC, and became the default liaison between the six women astronaut candidates and NASA management. She spoke with them before the initial news conference, and urged them to consider how much personal information they would divulge. They decided to adopt a group approach, and keep their private lives remaining private. The Houston Post chose to write about how the husbands of Fisher and Lucid had chosen to leave their jobs and move to Houston with their astronaut candidate wives. Psychological testing soon showed that the women astronauts had far more in common with their male counterparts than with the female population of the United States as a whole.

Of the 35 astronaut candidates, 20 came from the armed services, and four others (Terry Hart, David Griggs, Norman Thagard and Ox van Hoften) had previously served in the military but were civilians at the time of their selection. Twenty had served in combat. Of the 15 pilot astronaut candidates, eight came from the US Navy, six from the USAF, and one (David Griggs) was a NASA test pilot.  All were test pilots, eight having graduated from the US Naval Test Pilot School at NAS Patuxent River, Maryland, and seven from the USAF Test Pilot School at Edwards Air Force Base in California. Of the twenty mission specialist astronaut candidates, seven came from the armed services, of whom four were from the USAF, and one each from the US Navy, USMC and US Army; Bob Stewart became the first Army officer to become an astronaut. Ten had never served in the military, although one of them, Katherine Sullivan, later served in the US Navy Reserve as an oceanographer from 1988 to 2006. Ten of the 35 had bachelor's degrees, thirteen had master's degrees and twelve had doctorates.

Training

Training was different from that of earlier astronaut classes in several ways, mainly because it was focused on the Space Shuttle. Jungle and desert survival training were dropped as the Space Shuttle's was not expected to land in such locations, although water survival training was continued.

Nineteen of the 35 had already undergone this training in the military, so the remaining 16 (which included all six women) were sent to Homestead Air Force Base in Florida for training with the 3613th Combat Crew Training Squadron. The candidate would then have to inflate their rubber raft, fire off a flare, and be plucked from the water by a waiting helicopter. This was followed by training at Vance Air Force Base in Oklahoma in the correct procedure in case they had to bail out of a T-38. This time 24 of the TFNGs had already completed this training, leaving just eleven, again including all six women. In addition to the T-38, Kathy Sullivan and Pinky Nelson qualified as scientific operators on the Martin/General Dynamics WB-57F Canberra.

Much of the first eight months of the astronaut candidates' training was in the classroom. Because there were so many of them, the astronaut candidates did not fit easily into the existing classrooms, so during classroom instruction they were split into two groups, red and blue, led by Rick Hauck and John Fabian respectively. They were chosen because they were older and of higher military rank than the other candidates; as leaders they became the ones who would report to George Abbey. Classroom training was given on a wide variety of subjects, including an introduction to the Space Shuttle program, space flight engineering, astronomy, orbital mechanics, ascent and entry aerodynamics and space flight physiology. Those accustomed to military and academic environments were surprised that subjects were taught, but not tested. Training in geology, a feature of the training of earlier classes, was continued, but the locations visited changed because the focus was now on observations of the Earth rather than the Moon.

The astronaut candidates were sent on a geological field trip to Arizona. They also visited Houston's Burke Baker Planetarium, the key NASA centers, including the Ames Research Center, Marshall Space Flight Center, Goddard Space Flight Center and Lewis Research Center, and Rockwell International's facility in Palmdale, California, where the Space Shuttle Orbiters were being built. Zero gravity training was carried out in the vomit comet, a modified Boeing KC-135 Stratotanker, and Extra-vehicular activity (EVA) training was conducted in the Neutral Buoyancy Laboratory, an enormous water tank. Some accommodation had to be made for the women: Space suits were made in smaller size, the Shuttle's cargo bay doors were made easier to open, and the design of the Space Shuttle orbiters was modified to make it easier for women to negotiate and reach the switches.

NASA maintained a small fleet of Northrop T-38 Talon jet aircraft at Ellington Field, not far from the JSC. These were used by the astronauts for visiting NASA and contractor installations around the country. They were also used as chase planes for the Space Shuttle, and it became a tradition for the crew to fly to KSC in T-38s before a mission. The T-38 was a trainer commonly used by the USAF and Navy, so most of the pilot astronaut candidates had flown it before, but none of the mission specialist candidates had, even among those who were trained pilots. Unlike previous astronaut groups, they were not sent to a military flight school to learn how to pilot the aircraft, but were required to learn how to fly in the back seat as a crew member. Jim Buchli and Dale Gardner had qualified for this role in the T-38 as Naval Flight Officers, and they drew up a training syllabus for mission specialist candidates with no flight experience that covered subjects such as navigation and the correct protocol for talking on the radio. Due the energy crisis of the 1970s and the consequent soaring cost of jet fuel, flight time was restricted to 15 hours a month.

On August 31, 1979, NASA announced that the 35 astronaut candidates had completed their training and evaluation, and were now officially astronauts, qualified for selection on space flight crews. This brought the number of active astronauts to 62. Their training, which had been expected to last 18 to 24 months, had been completed in just 14. Training of subsequent classes was shortened to just 12 months. The initiation of a selection of the next class of astronaut candidates had already been announced on April 1. Although NASA considered them astronauts, most did not feel like real astronauts until they were "veterans"—astronauts who had flown in space. Had the Space Shuttle program been running on schedule, they would have been immediately assigned to flight, but it was now running more than two years behind. Veteran astronaut Alan Bean, the TFNG's coordinator, counseled patience, reminding them that the Group 7 astronauts had been waiting over ten years for their first flights.

Operations

First missions
The first six Space Shuttle missions were orbital flight tests (OFTs). Each was commanded by a veteran astronaut, starting with John Young, a Next Nine astronaut who had walked on the Moon on Apollo 16, and piloted by a Group 7 astronaut on his first flight, starting with Bob Crippen. The TFNG performed support roles. As with earlier classes, each astronaut was allocated an area of expertise to specialize in. For the OFTs, the role of capsule communicator (CAPCOM), the astronaut at the Mission Control Center at JSC who spoke directly to the crew, was allocated to veteran astronauts, with a member of the TFNG as his backup, but Dan Brandenstein stepped up to become the CAPCOM for the ascent phase of the first mission, STS-1, when Ed Gibson retired. 

Once the OFTs were completed, the Space Shuttle could commence its designated role of launching satellites. The pilots of the STS-1 and STS-2, Bob Crippen and Dick Truly, were given command of STS-7 and STS-8 respectively, with TFNGs Rick Hauck and Dan Brandenstein assigned as their pilots. This established a pattern that would continue of a pilot astronaut flying as a pilot on one mission, and then as a commander on the next.  NASA management wanted a woman and an African American flown as soon as possible, so George Abbey selected Sally Ride and Guion Bluford. Chris Kraft thought that this decision should be considered further, so Bob Crippen, Carolyn Huntoon, Leonard S. Nicholson (the acting associate director of JSC) and Samuel L. Pool from NASA's Space Sciences directorate were consulted. Ultimately, John Fabian was named as MS-1 for STS-7, with Sally Ride as MS-2, and Guion Bluford as MS-1 for STS-8 with Dale Gardner as MS-2.

The MS-1 on a Space shuttle flight sat behind the pilot on the flight deck, and monitored displays and checklists. The MS-2 was the flight engineer, and sat behind the commander. The Flight Engineer assisted the commander and pilot, and acted as the third member of the flight deck crew, and an additional set of eyes during the critical phases of a mission. The hopes of NASA management that a CDR-PLT-MS2 team would be able to fly three or four missions a year were never realized. After a single mission as pilot, a pilot astronaut became eligible to be commander on their next mission. Although some of the mission specialists were fully qualified pilots, none ever flew as pilot on a mission, and therefore never served as a mission commander. As more than one mission specialist flew on each flight, they began flying at a faster rate than their pilot classmates. Two pilot astronauts, David Griggs and Steven Nagel, flew their first missions as mission specialists. Nagel later flew as the pilot on STS-61-A and as the commander on STS-37 and STS-55. Griggs was assigned as the STS-33 pilot, but he was killed in an air crash prior to the mission.

Achievements

These missions began a sizable number of American spaceflight "firsts" achieved by the group:
First American woman in space: Sally Ride (June 18, 1983, STS-7)
First African-American in space: Guion Bluford (August 30, 1983, STS-8)
First American woman to perform an EVA: Kathryn Sullivan (October 11, 1984, STS-41-G)
First mother in space: Anna Fisher (November 8, 1984, STS-51-A)
First Asian-American in space: Ellison Onizuka (January 24, 1985, STS-51-C)
First African-American to pilot and command a mission: Frederick Gregory (April 29, 1985, STS-51-B; November 23, 1989, STS-33)
First American to launch on a Russian rocket: Norman Thagard (March 14, 1995, Soyuz TM-21)
First American woman to make a long-duration spaceflight: Shannon Lucid (March to September 1996, Mir NASA-1)
First American active duty astronauts to marry: Robert Gibson and Rhea Seddon
First Army astronaut: Bob Stewart

Four members of the group, Dick Scobee, Judy Resnik, Ellison Onizuka and Ronald McNair, died in the Space Shuttle Challenger disaster These four, plus Shannon Lucid, received the Congressional Space Medal of Honor, giving this astronaut class five total recipients of this top NASA award. This is second only to the New Nine class which received seven. By the time of the Challenger disaster, all 35 members of the group had flown in space, and some had flown twice.

Final missions

The last flight made by a member of the group was STS-93 in July 1999, which carried Steve Hawley into space for the fifth time. He had served as flight engineer on all five of his missions. The mission involved the deployment of the Chandra X-ray Observatory; nine years before he had help deploy the Hubble Space Telescope. In all, the Group 8 astronauts flew 103 missions, totaling over 981 days in space. The leader was Shannon Lucid, who spent over 223 days in space over the course of five missions.

Group 8 astronauts also performed important ground-based duties. Sally Ride served on the Rogers Commission after the Space Shuttle Challenger disaster in 1986, and on the Columbia Accident Investigation Board after the Space Shuttle Columbia  disaster in 2003. Sixteen members of the group served various selection boards for later groups of astronauts, the first being for NASA Astronaut Group 10 in 1984. Dan Brandenstein was Chief of the Astronaut Office from  April 1987 through September 1992, and Hoot Gibson from December 1992 to September 1994. Dan Brandenstein had been CAPCOM for the first Space Shuttle mission in April 1981,  and Shannon Lucid continued to perform as CAPCOM duties for shuttle missions until and including STS-135, the final Space Shuttle mission in 2011. She retired on January 31, 2012.

With Lucid's retirement, only Anna Fisher remained at NASA.  She worked for the Capsule Communicator and Exploration branches of NASA as a station CAPCOM and on display development for the Orion project. She was on the selection board for NASA Astronaut Group 20 in 2009, the first group since 1978 who would not be trained to fly the Space Shuttle. The role of mission specialist was abolished, and crew members who flew to the ISS were classified as flight engineers. Fisher served as an ISS Capsule Communicator (CAPCOM) at the Mission Control Center from January 2011 through August 2013, and was the lead CAPCOM for Expedition 33 in 2012. She retired on April 29, 2017, the last of the Group 8 astronauts who had been selected nearly forty years before. The Thirty Five New Guys reshaped the image of the American astronaut into one that reflected the diversity of American society, and they paved the way for future classes of astronauts, which would include women as pilots and commanders.

Notes

References

External links
Astronaut Biographies: Home Page
Astronaut Selection and Training

NASA Astronaut Corps
Lists of astronauts
Sally Ride